Nizhniye Karamaly (Tübänge Qaramalı) is a rural locality (a selo) in Srednekarmalinsky Selsoviet, Yermekeyevsky District, Bashkortostan, Russia. The population was 336 as of 2010. There are 3 streets.

Geography 
Nizhniye Karamaly is located 18 km southwest of Yermekeyevo (the district's administrative centre) by road. Petrovka is the nearest rural locality.

References 

Rural localities in Yermekeyevsky District